North Ogilville is an unincorporated community in Ohio Township, Bartholomew County, in the U.S. state of Indiana. North Ogilville is located north of Ogilville on State Route 58, hence the name.

Geography

References

Unincorporated communities in Bartholomew County, Indiana
Unincorporated communities in Indiana